Emre Elivar (born 21 August 1976, in Ankara) is a Turkish concert pianist.

Emre Elivar began his studies and graduated from State Conservatoire in Ankara. The DAAD scholarship made his further education and specialization at music academies “Carl Maria von Weber“ Dresden and “Hanns Eisler“ Berlin possible, at latter he obtained his master's degree and title “Konzertpianist”.

During his studies and early career Emre Elivar won several international music prizes like the triple awards in Bremen in 1999, the bronze medal at “Cidado do Porto” in 1999 and at “World Piano Competition” in Cincinnati in 2000, Steinway-Prize in 2001, Arthur Schnabel Prize in 2002 and Vendôme-Prize in 2003.

Among his concerts in international arena the most important recitals are surely the first performance of Well Tempered Clavier 1 by J. S. Bach in complete in Turkey during the Istanbul International Music Festival in 2005, the “Great Variations” in 2008 again for the Istanbul International Music Festival with works by F. Mendelssohn (Variations Sérieuses op. 54), J. Brahms (both books of Paganini-Variations op. 35) and L. v. Beethoven (Diabelli-Variations op. 120), and his USA debut in Washington DC in 2009, organized by “Embassy Series”, dedicated to rarely performed works by R. Schumann and F. Chopin. In one of his recent concerts the artist bewitched a highly expert audience in Istanbul by works of Shostakovich (Aphorisms op. 13 and the 2nd Sonata op. 61) and Prokofjew (Visions Fugitives op. 22, Sarcasms op. 17, and the 2nd Sonata op. 14). As soloist he performed with orchestras such as Konzerthausorchester Berlin, Nordwestdeutsche Philharmonie, Dortmunder Philharmoniker, Staatsorchester Kassel, Anhaltische Philharmonie Dessau, Bilkent Symphony Orchestra, Borusan Istanbul Philharmonic Orchestra, Bursa Regional State Symphony Orchestra, Orquestra Nacional do Porto, Lithuanian Chamber Orchestra etc.

Along with his Bremer recording of the French Suite No. 3 BWV 817 by J. S. Bach and the Concerto No. 1 by F. Liszt, the artist also recorded important works of several Turkish composers and recently as a double album the Three Last Sonatas opp. 109, 110, 111 and the Diabelli - Variations, op. 120 by L. v. Beethoven. His new CD recently released by Sony BMG with works by F. Schubert (Three Piano Pieces D 946) and R. Schumann (Symphonic Etudes op. 13) earned great reviews internationally. The highlight for the season 2009/2010 was definitely his concert in June 2010, totally dedicated to R. Schumann containing both his sonatas, broadcast live to honor Schumann’s 200th birthday by 50 members of EBU (European Broadcast Union).

Emre Elivar has been living  in Bursa and working at Uludağ University State Conservatory since 2019.

External links 
 Emre Elivar Official Website
 Schubert: Klavierstücke D 946, Schumann: Sinfonische Etüden op. 13
http://uludag.edu.tr/konservatuvar/default/konu/3720

Living people
1976 births
Turkish pianists
21st-century pianists